Worthing Football Club is a semi-professional English association football club based in Worthing, West Sussex, currently playing in the National League South, the sixth tier of English football. The club plays at Woodside Road.

History
The club was originally formed as Worthing Association Football Club (a name that lasted until 1899) in February 1886 and played friendlies and Sussex Senior Cup ties for the first few years of their existence.

In 1896 the club became founding members of the West Sussex Football League, joining the Senior Division. During their time in the West Sussex league they were league champions on seven occasions. In May 1900 the club absorbed local rivals Worthing Athletic and a year later moved to its current home, then known simply as the Sports Ground, now as Woodside Road. In 1905 another rival team, Worthing Rovers, was also absorbed.

The club's intriguing nickname of "The Rebels" dates from when it resigned from the West Sussex League on a point of principle over a rule change, prior to becoming a founder member of the Sussex County League in 1920.  Worthing are also known as "The Mackerel Men", a reference to the three fish prominent on the club crest.

In 1920 Worthing became founder members of the Sussex County League, where once again they won eight league titles, in fact in the twenty seasons prior to World War II they only finished outside the top four on two occasions.

In 1948–49 Worthing joined the Corinthian League but met with little success. In 1963 the Corinthian League disbanded and most of its clubs joined the newly created Athenian League Division One, where Worthing won promotion at the first attempt, although after three seasons in the Premier Division, two successive relegations saw them drop to Division 2.

After managing a return to the top division, Worthing joined the Isthmian League in 1977, initially in Division Two, but by 1983 they had reached the Premier Division under manager Barry Lloyd and in fact finished as runners-up in 1983–84 and 1984–85. After Lloyd's departure to Brighton & Hove Albion, however, the club soon slipped back down to Division Two, finishing bottom of Division One in the 1990–91 season with only 10 points and having conceded a huge 157 goals.

Former Northern Ireland international Gerry Armstrong was appointed manager in 1991 and in 1992–93 led the club to promotion back to Division One, which was followed two years later by a return to the Premier Division under John Robson, although Worthing finished bottom in their first season back in the Premier Division and were to remain in Division One until 2004 when the re-organisation of the English football league system saw them moved back to the Premier Division. They were relegated at the end of the 2006–07 season.

The club then reached the play-offs under manager Alan Pook two seasons in a row, losing both matches without scoring a goal. Unknown young manager, Simon Colbran then took the helm and soon became a fans' favourite as the Rebels topped the league for much of Autumn and Winter. Despite several budget cuts, the Rebels finished third and narrowly missed out in the playoffs at home to Godalming.

Former Brighton & Hove Albion player Adam Hinshelwood was appointed Worthing manager in December 2013 and lost his first game away at Burgess Hill 4–1.  In January 2015 the playing budget at the club was completely cut and its debts revealed to be around £200,000. The future of the club looked in serious doubt until March 2015 when local football enthusiast, and former Worthing youth team player, George Dowell became the majority shareholder in the club, with plans to invest in its slow growth.  On 10 June 2015, Hinshelwood resigned from the club to take up a full-time coaching post at Brighton & Hove Albion, and was replaced by assistant manager Jon Meeney and 29-year-old defender Gary Elphick.

In 2016, Worthing were promoted to the Isthmian League Premier Division via the play-offs, having finished the 2015–16 season in third place in the southern division. In late 2017, Adam Hinshelwood returned to the club as first team manager. In the 2019–20 season, Worthing led the Premier Division and were favourites for promotion when the season was terminated early due to the COVID-19 pandemic. In the 2021–22 season, the club were more successful and promotion to the National League South was confirmed following a 2–0 victory over Bowers & Pitsea.  They also reached the Sussex Senior Cup final but were defeated 4–2 by Brighton & Hove Albion at Falmer Stadium.

League history

notes: * Won promotion to Isthmian League Premier Division via play-offs

(*) Includes 5 games played at Bognor, average at Woodside Road was 708

Ground

A sports ground opened on the Woodside Road site as early as 1892 when the site was part of the parish of West Tarring, which at the time was not yet part of the borough of Worthing.  Known as the Pavilion Road Sports Ground, it occupied a 13-acre site, with a Queen Anne style pavilion giving its name to Pavilion Road along the south of the site.  Worthing FC moved to the ground in 1903. In 1937 the Sports Ground closed and it is the site's  northern portion which developed into the existing stadium.  The southern portion of the Sports Ground became tennis courts and then in 1948 became home to Worthing Pavilion Bowls Club. Floodlights were installed in 1977. At the end of 1984–85 Woodside Road's main stand burnt down.

The ground has also been home to Horsham (during the 2008–09 season) and Brighton & Hove Albion's reserve team after the closure of the Goldstone Ground in 1997.

In June 2015, Worthing's new owner George Dowell released plans to improve the stadium.  The plans saw an artificial 3G pitch installed to replace the turf surface, a refurbished bar open seven days a week and a refurbished main stand including new seats and rails and new paint across the whole of the stand.

In May 2020, further plans to improve the stadium were announced. The £150,000 development will see new floodlights, refurbished changing rooms, and  a new block of toilets and a bar in the north east corner of the ground.  The club reached its £43,000 crowdfunding target to assist the financing of these projects. They also mentioned that any extra money raised will all go into the stadium for future additions like a new scoreboard and improving accessibility in the main stand.

Continuing technical problems with the 3G artificial pitch led to the playing surface being completely renewed in November 2020, with a new base and drainage being laid, causing the club to temporarily play home matches at Horsham F.C.

Honours

League
Isthmian League Division One (Tier 7)
Champions (1): 1982–83
Isthmian League Premier Division (Tier 7)
Winners (1): 2021–22 
Isthmian League Division One South (Tier 8)
Play-off winners (1): 2015–16
Isthmian League Division Two (Tier 8)
Winners (2): 1981–82, 1992–93
Sussex County League 
Winners (8): – 1920–21, 1921–22, 1926–27, 1928–29, 1930–31, 1933–34, 1938–39, 1939–40

Cups
Sussex Senior Challenge Cup
Winners (21): 1892–93, 1903–04, 1907–08, 1913–14, 1919–20, 1922–23, 1926–27, 1928–29, 1934–35, 1939–40, 1944–45, 1945–46, 1946–47, 1951–52, 1956–57, 1958–59, 1960–61, 1974–75, 1976–77, 1977–78, 1998–99
The Sussex Royal Ulster Rifles Charity Cup
Winners (14): 1903–04, 1906–07, 1907–08, 1909–10, 1913–14, 1920–21, 1926–27, 1933–34 (shared with Horsham), 1939–40, 1941–42, 1944–45, 1948–49 (shared with Horsham),  1952–53, 1953–54

Records
Best league performance: 1st in Isthmian League Premier Division, 2021–22
Best FA Cup performance: 2nd round, 1982–83
Best FA Youth Cup performance: 3rd round, 2015–16
Best FA Amateur Cup performance: Quarter-finals, 1907–08
Best FA Trophy performance: 4th round, 2003–04
Best FA Vase performance: 5th round, 1978–79
Record attendance: 3,600 vs Wimbledon, FA Cup, 14 November 1936
Biggest victory: 25–0 vs Littlehampton, Sussex League, 1911–12
Heaviest defeat: 0–14 vs Southwick, Sussex County League, 1946–47
Most appearances: Mark Knee, 414
Most goals: Mick Edmonds, 276
Record youth attendance: 1,154 vs Middlesbrough, FA Youth Cup third round, 2015–16
Record signing: Nko Ekoku from Leatherhead (2003)

Managerial history

Notable players

Sources

See also
Sport in Worthing

References

External links

Official site

Isthmian League
Football clubs in West Sussex
Association football clubs established in 1896
Sport in Worthing
Corinthian League (football)
Athenian League
1896 establishments in England
Football clubs in England
West Sussex Football League
National League (English football) clubs